Battle of Valencia may refer to:
1762, the Battle of Valencia de Alcántara, an engagement during the Spanish invasion of Portugal
1808, the Battle of Valencia (1808) during the Peninsular War
1812, the Siege of Valencia (1812) during the Peninsular War
1970s and 1980s, the Battle of Valencia (cultural), a conflict about the identity of the Valencian people and the Land of Valencia symbols during Spanish democratic transition.